Mount Washburn, elevation , is a prominent mountain peak in the Washburn Range in Yellowstone National Park, Wyoming. The peak was named in 1870 to honor Henry D. Washburn, leader of the Washburn–Langford–Doane Expedition. The Washburn Range is one of two mountains ranges completely within the boundaries of Yellowstone.

History

On August 29, 1870, members of the Washburn-Langford-Doane Expedition ascended the peak they named Mount Washburn after their expedition leader, Henry D. Washburn. A portion of Lt. Gustavus Cheyney Doane's description is quoted below:

Mount Washburn became a very popular tourist attraction early in the park's history. Many tourist accounts tell of a trip to the summit of Mount Washburn. In 1879, Mrs. Elizabeth D. Wickes of Boulder, Montana, in a party of eight men and five ladies, spent six weeks touring the park. Her account of Mount Washburn follows:

In 1914, two years before automobiles were allowed in Yellowstone, noted author Elbert Hubbard and his wife Alice spent two weeks touring Yellowstone. In a short article written after the trip—A Little Journey to the Yellowstone Hubbard described his visit to Mount Washburn.

Mount Washburn trails

Views from the summit include much of the northern section of Yellowstone National Park and on clear days, the Teton Range is also visible. The mountain trails are some of the most frequented in the park, so summer hikes can be crowded. Another trail that climbs  in only  starts from the Chittenden parking area.

One of three active fire lookout towers in Yellowstone is located on the summit. There is a small visitor center and restrooms on the first floor, an observation deck on the second, and a ranger's residence on the top floor (closed to the public).

Closure

During 2021, all trails to the top of Mt. Washburn are closed due to construction projects in the Canyon Overlooks area.

See also
 List of mountains and mountain ranges of Yellowstone National Park

References

External links 
 Mount Washburn Webcam – A webcam from the fire lookout tower atop Mount Washburn.

Washburn
Washburn
Washburn